The US Aviation Super Floater (also called the SuperFloater and Superfloater) is an American high-wing, strut-braced, single-seat glider that was designed by Klaus Hill and Larry Hall and produced by US Aviation initially, and later by Wind Walker Aircraft Co. It first flew in 1970.

Design and development
The Super Floater is an ultralight sailplane that is designed for fun flying, rather than competition, and as such it has a glide ratio of just 15:1. It is very similar to the primary gliders of the 1930s in concept, performance and appearance. Designed to fit into the US FAR 103 Ultralight Vehicles regulations, most are not registered with the Federal Aviation Administration. Most were factory built and delivered completed and ready to fly, although some may have been completed as homebuilt aircraft.

The aircraft is made from aluminium tube, covered with Dacron. Its  span wing is braced by twin "V" struts and jury struts. The cruciform tail is strut-braced. The controls consist of a side stick and rudder pedals. The landing gear is a monowheel gear, mounted directly behind the pilot. A ballistic parachute was factory-optional equipment.

The aircraft was initially produced by US Aviation in the early 1970s, but production ended in the 1980s. It was briefly re-introduced by Wind Walker Aircraft Co in 1995, following a redesign, with US Aviation as distributor for US$5,995 fully assembled.

Operational history

Specifications (Super Floater)

See also

References

External links
 Photo of Super Floater on tow
 Photo of a Super Floater in flight

1970s United States sailplanes
Homebuilt aircraft
Aircraft first flown in 1970
High-wing aircraft